Kise may refer to:
Kise stable, a stable of sumo wrestlers founded in 1958
Kise stable (2003), another sumo stable founded in 2003
Kise Oyakata, the head coach of the 2003 stable
Kise, Kentucky

See also
Kise Mill Bridge Historic District
Kise Mill Bridge
Kise Apna Kahein